Sillitoe is a surname. Notable people with the surname include:

Acton Sillitoe (1840–1894), British Anglican bishop
Alan Sillitoe (1928–2010), British writer
Les Sillitoe (1915–1996), British trade union leader and politician
Linda Sillitoe (1948–2010), American journalist, poet and historian
Neville Sillitoe (born 1925), Australian athletics coach
Nicholas Sillitoe (born 1971), British composer and music producer
Percy Sillitoe (1888–1962), British law enforcement executive

See also 
 Sillitoe tartan is a nickname given to the distinctive black and white chequered pattern often used by police